The 23rd Vanier Cup was played on November 21, 1987, at Varsity Stadium in Toronto, Ontario, and decided the CIAU football champion for the 1987 season. The McGill Redmen won their first ever championship by defeating the defending champion UBC Thunderbirds by a score of 47–11.

References

External links
 Official website

Vanier Cup
Vanier Cup
1987 in Toronto
November 1987 sports events in Canada